Spellbound is a 2002 American documentary that was directed by Jeffrey Blitz. The film follows eight competitors in the 1999 Scripps National Spelling Bee. The film received positive reviews and won several awards, including a nomination for the Academy Award for Best Documentary Feature.

Spellers 
The spellers were Neil Kadakia, Emily Stagg, Ashley White, April DeGideo, Harry Altman, Angela Arenivar, Nupur Lala and Ted Brigham. As they appear from left to right on the DVD's cover:

Neil Kadakia 
Neil (as speller # 139) missed "hellebore" as "helebore" in the bee to get ninth place. Other words Neil spelled include: encephalon, desecration, mercenary, Darjeeling, and hypsometer.  He was sponsored by the Orange County Register.  Neil is a graduate of UC Berkeley. He is currently the COO of Greens Global, a real estate company based out of San Clemente, CA. On July 3, 2011, he married Archana Sheth, also a UC Berkeley graduate. He is also an avid chess player, and has earned over 15 chess trophies in his life. His grandfather paid 1000 people in India to pray for him.

Emily Stagg 
Emily Stagg (speller # 148) was sponsored by the New Haven Register in New Haven, Connecticut and spelled: seguidilla, disclaimant, kookaburra, viand, apocope, brunneous, clavecin (spelled incorrectly as "clavison").  She came in 6th place.  In 2006, as a junior in Carleton College, she wrote an op-ed article for the New York Times questioning the usefulness of the National Spelling Bee.

Ashley White 
Ashley White (speller 149) represented The Washington Informer in Washington, DC in the spelling bee, spelling "lycanthrope" before misspelling "ecclesiastical" in the third round. Following Ashley's teenage pregnancy (she was 18), a marketing consultant who had seen the movie managed to rally support from other viewers of the documentary to help Ashley into Howard University.  The proctor of the Washington Informer regional spelling bee featured in the film is Mac McGarry

April DeGideo 
April DeGideo, who lives in Ambler, Pennsylvania, participated in the 1998 and 1999 bees, in the latter of which she placed third, representing the Times Herald of Norristown, Pennsylvania. April graduated in 2007 from New York University with a degree in Journalism. She then went on to get a second degree in creative writing and later went on to publish two books. The study guide, and Where to start.

Harry Altman 
Many critics who reviewed Spellbound singled out Altman (speller # 8) as its most interesting "character". Roger Ebert wrote that he "has so many eccentricities that he'd be comic relief in a teenage comedy... He screws his face up into so many shapes while trying to spell a word that it's a wonder the letters can find their way to the surface." He spelled "cephalalgia" and "odyssey" over the course of the bee. In a prolonged clip, Altman was eliminated in the fourth round, on the word "banns", which he spelled "bands". He later appeared in the 2001 Bee, but was again eliminated in the fourth round. Altman went to the Academy for Engineering and Design Technology in Hackensack, New Jersey. In autumn 2005, he enrolled in the University of Chicago. In 2014 Harry completed a PhD in Mathematics from the University of Michigan, focusing on integer complexity.

Angela Arenivar 
Angela Arenivar represented the Amarillo Globe-News in the 1998 and 1999 bees, being eliminated in the latter during the third round. Angela graduated from Texas A&M University in 2007 with a bachelor's degree in Spanish and earned a master's in Spanish from the University of New Mexico in 2009.  She has taught Spanish in Texas public high schools.  Angela now attends Texas A&M University pursuing her Ph.D. in Hispanic Studies.

Nupur Lala 
Nupur Lala was the champion of the 1999 Scripps National Spelling Bee (as speller # 155), spelling "logorrhea" to win. Nupur won the bee against David Lewandowski, a speller from Indiana who misspelled "opsimath."  She turned down an MTV reality show that would have followed her college years.   In 2003, she entered University of Michigan at Ann Arbor to study brain and cognitive sciences and pre-medical studies and graduated in 2007 with a degree in Brain, Behavior and Cognitive Science.  In the fall of 2014 she entered the College of Medicine at the University of Arkansas for Medical Sciences. She also appeared in the 2020 documentary Spelling the Dream.

Ted Brigham 
Ted Brigham was speller # 1. He represented the Rolla Daily Record of Rolla, Missouri. One of the more notable stories from his experience is the congratulations posted by students on the marquee in front of his high school in which "champ" was misspelled (presumably as an ironic joke) as "chapm". Ted misspelled "distractible" in the second round, becoming the first of the eight spellers eliminated. Ted attended medical school in Kansas City, Missouri until his death in December 2007. His family chose not to disclose the circumstances of his death.

Other notable spellers 
 George Thampy was speller # 245 in the bee and was mentioned several times within the film. He misspelled "kirtle" as "curtle" for third place, tying with April DeGideo. Thampy eventually won the 2000 national bee.
 David Lewandowski finished second place in the spelling bee, spelling "opsimath" as "opsomath". After David's mistake, Nupur spelled "logorrhea" to win the competition.
 Allyson Lieberman was originally slated to be featured as one of the spellers in the documentary, but her clips were ultimately left out of the film; the scene involving her can be found in the special features of the DVD. The youngest contestant in the entire 1998 bee, she misspelled "purblind".
 Frances Taschuk and Ann Foley are shown in the final set of scenes prior to the last round of the spelling bee. Frances misspells "acoelous" and Ann "quinquevir".
 Vinay Krupadev is in a scene involving Harry's mother feeling "sorry for the boy from Texas who got 'yenta'". She was referring to Vinay, who is actually from Marietta, Ohio, and his pronunciation of "yenta," shown in the film. He eventually spelled it "yente".
 Jess Altman was mentioned in a scene by Harry Altman for being a terrific speller and that he was disappointed she didn't make the Nationals.
 Sonia Nagala won the North Dakota bee with the word "butyraceous", but was eliminated in the second round of the Nationals.  She completed her MBA at Harvard Business School in 2018.
 Frank Neuhauser, winner of the first National Spelling Bee, held in 1925, also appears in the film.

Reception

Spellbound opened to positive reviews from critics. Rotten Tomatoes gives the film an approval rating of 97%, based on reviews from 139 critics, and an average rating of 8.27/10. The website's critical consensus states, "A suspenseful, gripping documentary that features an engaging cross section of American children". Metacritic gives the film a weighted average score of 80% based on reviews from 34 critics, indicating "generally favorable reviews".

Awards

The film was nominated for the Academy Award for Best Documentary Feature; Yana Gorskaya's editing won the ACE Eddie award for best editing of documentary.  Spellbound won the Emmy Award for Cultural/Artistic Programming and Jeffrey Blitz was nominated for directing.

In 2007, it was included as #4 of the "IDA's Top 25 Documentaries" of all-time by the members of the International Documentary Association.

See also 
 Scripps National Spelling Bee
 Spelling bee
 List of documentaries
 72nd Scripps National Spelling Bee

References

External links 
 
 
 
 
 
 
 Round-by-Round Results of the 1999 Scripps Howard National Spelling Bee
 1999 Scripps Howard National Spelling Bee Contestants
 Star Struggles for Happier Ending Article on Ashley White.

2002 films
2002 documentary films
American documentary films
Documentary films about words and language
Scripps National Spelling Bee
Films about spelling competitions
Documentary films about children
2002 directorial debut films
2000s English-language films
2000s American films